This page lists the city flags in South America. It is a part of the Lists of city flags, which is split into continents due to its size.

Argentina

Bolivia

Brazil

Chile

Colombia

Ecuador

French Guiana

Guyana

Paraguay

Peru

Historical

Uruguay

Venezuela

See also 
 List of city flags in Africa
 List of city flags in Asia
 List of city flags in Europe
 List of city flags in North America
 List of city flags in Oceania

References

External links 
 Argentina: Municipal flags of Argentina by Flags of the World.
 Brazil: Municipal flags of Brazil by Flags of the World.
 Colombia: Municipal flags of Colombia by Flags of the World.
 Ecuador: Municipal flags of Ecuador by Flags of the World.
 Guyana: Municipal flags of Guyana by Flags of the World.